Kolkata Museum of Modern Art (KMOMA) is a proposed art museum to be built in New Town, Kolkata.

The KMOMA had been estimated to cost about Rs 500 crore and is set to be built on a 10-acre plot in the nearby township of New Town by the state government, is designed by acclaimed Swiss architects Herzog & de Meuron, who created the Bird's Nest stadium for the Beijing Olympics.

The Chief Minister of West Bengal Mamata Banerjee had laid the foundation stone for this project in November 2013.

Location
The park will be surrounded by Akankha on the north, the New Town Eco Park and Kolkata International Convention Center on the south, the upcoming Central Business District and International Financial Hub on the east, and existing human settlement of Jatragachi/Hatiara on the west and south-west.

See also
Indian Museum
HIDCO
List of museums in India
List of museums in West Bengal
Museum of Modern Art
The Last Harvest : Paintings of Rabindranath Tagore

References

External links
Official homepage

Art museums and galleries in Kolkata
Modern art museums
Proposed museums in India
New Town, Kolkata